The Hong Kong Sailing Federation is the national governing body for the sport of sailing in Hong Kong, recognised by the International Sailing Federation.

History

Founded as the Hong Kong Yacht Racing Federation in 1962, the HKSF was incorporated as a Company Limited by Guarantee in 1970 under the name Hong Kong Yachting Association. It changed its name to Hong Kong Sailing Federation in 2004 following the change of name of the International Sailing Federation. The HKSF membership consists of individuals, associations and clubs.

The HKSF is affiliated to:
 International Sailing Federation (ISAF)
 Asian Sailing Federation (ASAF)
 Sports Federation & Olympic Committee of Hong Kong, China (SF&OC)

It also represents interests of the recreational boating and yachting circles of Hong Kong on the Marine Department Committee as well as the interests of Hong Kong sailors to the Hong Kong SAR Government, Leisure and Cultural Services Department etc.

Notable sailors
See :Category:Hong Kong sailors

Olympic sailing
See :Category:Olympic sailors of Hong Kong

Offshore sailing
See :Category:Hong Kong sailors (sport)

Yacht clubs
See :Category:Yacht clubs in Hong Kong

References

External links
 Official website

Hong Kong
Sailing
1962 establishments in Hong Kong